The 2009 Copa Petrobras Bogotá was a professional tennis tournament played on outdoor clay courts. It was the sixth edition of the tournament which was part of the 2009 ATP Challenger Tour. It took place in Bogotá, Colombia between 21 and 27 September 2009.

Singles main draw entrants

Seeds

 Rankings are as of 14 September 2009.

Other entrants
The following players received wildcards into the singles main draw:
  Alejandro González
  Sebastián López
  Mariano Puerta
  Eduardo Struvay

The following players received entry from the qualifying draw:
  Andre Begemann
  Michael Quintero
  Nicolás Todero
  Caio Zampieri

Champions

Singles

 Carlos Salamanca def.  Riccardo Ghedin, 6–1, 7–6(5)

Doubles

 Alejandro Falla /  Alejandro González def.  Sebastián Decoud /  Diego Álvarez, 5–7, 6–4, [10–8]

References
Official website
ITF search 
2009 Draws

Copa Petrobras Bogota
Tennis tournaments in Colombia
Clay court tennis tournaments
Copa Petrobras Bogotá
2009 in Colombian tennis